Deutschland is the German-language word, or endonym, for Germany.

Deutschland may also refer to:

Ships  
 , the name of several steamships
 , the name of ships of the German Empire's Kaiserliche Marine
 , built for the German Kaiserliche Marine
 , an antarctic research vessel 
 , in World War I
 , a museum ship
 , class of ships known as pocket battleships
 
 , launched in 1960
 , a cruise ship launched in 1998
 , a fishing trawler in service 1934-39. Served as the vorpostenboot V 404 Deutschland and V 403 Deutschland 1939–40

Other uses 
 "Deutschland" (song), by Rammstein, 2019

See also

Dutchland (disambiguation)
 Deutschland 83, a 2015 German television series
 Deutsch-les-Landes, a 2018 Franco-Germanic TV series
 
 
 Dutch (disambiguation)
 Deutsch (disambiguation)
 Land (disambiguation)
 Germany (disambiguation)